Jak Martin (born 7 September 1988) is an English former first-class cricketer.

Martin was born at Kingston upon Thames in September 1988. He was educated at the Glyn School, before going up to Oxford Brookes University. While studying at Oxford Brookes, Martin played first-class cricket for Oxford UCCE and MCCU in 2009 and 2010, making six appearances. Martin scored 290 runs in his six matches, at an average of 32.22 and with a high score of 81, one of two half centuries he made.

After graduating from Oxford Brookes, Martin became a schoolteacher. He returned to his former school, where he is head of physical education and games.

Notes and references

External links

1988 births
Living people
People from Kingston upon Thames
People educated at Glyn School
Alumni of Oxford Brookes University
English cricketers
Oxford MCCU cricketers
Schoolteachers from Surrey